The men's doubles tournament at the 1986 US Open was held from August 26 to September 7, 1986, on the outdoor hard courts at the USTA National Tennis Center in New York City, United States. Andrés Gómez and Slobodan Živojinović won the title, defeating Joakim Nyström and Mats Wilander in the final.

Draw

Finals

Top half

Section 1

Section 2

Bottom half

Section 3

Section 4

External links
 Main draw
1986 US Open – Men's draws and results at the International Tennis Federation

Men's Doubles
US Open (tennis) by year – Men's doubles